Nosodendron unicolor, the slime flux beetle, is a species of wounded-tree beetle in the family Nosodendridae. It is found in North America.

References

Further reading

 
 
 

Polyphaga
Articles created by Qbugbot
Beetles described in 1824